Mario Capanna (born 10 January 1945) is an Italian politician and writer.

Born in Città di Castello, he studied Philosophy at the Catholic University of Milan, and was the leader of the Italian students' movement in the late 1960s and early 1970s. In 1969 he was attacked by exponents of the neo-Fascist Italian Social Movement.

In 1975 he entered politics, adhering to the Proletarian Unity Party (PdUP), which later merged with Proletarian Democracy (DP). Capanna was charismatic leader of the latter until 27 June 1987, when he resigned, succeeded by Giovanni Russo Spena.

Capanna was elected for the DP to the Italian Chamber of Deputies (1983–1987), and to the European Parliament (1979).

In 1989 he broke away from the Proletarian Democracy to form the Rainbow Greens party.

Capanna is currently President of the Committee for Genetical Rights, an independent association devoted to information on Biotechnology.

Capanna is a supporter of the Campaign for the Establishment of a United Nations Parliamentary Assembly, an organisation which advocates for democratic reformation of the United Nations.

Works
Formidabili quegli anni (1988)
Arafat (1989)
Speranze (1994)
Il fiume della prepotenza (1996)
Lettera a mio figlio sul '68 (1998)
L'Italia viva (2000)
Verrò da te (2003)

References

1945 births
Living people
People from Città di Castello
Proletarian Democracy politicians
Rainbow Greens politicians
Federation of the Greens politicians
Deputies of Legislature IX of Italy
Deputies of Legislature X of Italy
Politicians of Umbria
Proletarian Democracy MEPs
MEPs for Italy 1979–1984
Italian male writers